Ernest E. Newton (born February 21, 1956) is an American politician in Bridgeport, Connecticut. Newton served for seventeen years in the Connecticut General Assembly, serving in the Connecticut House of Representatives from 1988 to 2003 and in the Connecticut State Senate from 2003 to 2006.  He pleaded guilty to federal felony corruption charges in September 2005 and served several years in federal prison. Newton was released in February 2010 and in 2012 unsuccessfully attempted a political comeback, losing in the primary in a race for his old state Senate seat.  In 2015, Newton was convicted on separate state campaign finance fraud charges; those convictions were overturned on appeal in 2018.

Career
Newton, a Democrat, specifically part of the Democratic Party of Connecticut, was a member of the Bridgeport City Council in the 1980s. He served in the Connecticut House of Representatives from 1988 to 2003 and in the Connecticut State Senate from 2003 to 2006.

Newton represented an area of Bridgeport that was one of poorest districts in Connecticut, and was "a powerful figure from the city's East Side for more than two decades."

Newton has admitted to receiving treatment for a crack cocaine habit in 1995 while in the state Senate.

2005 federal felony convictions for corruption
During his seventeen years in the state Legislature, Newton "was known for high-flown rhetoric, at one point describing himself as 'the Moses of my people' and 'God's faithful servant.'" Newton is also known for his flamboyant clothing, wearing colorful tailored suits with matching shoes.

Newton pleaded guilty in federal court on September 20, 2005, to charges of bribery, mail fraud and evasion of federal income tax. Newton admitted to taking a $5,000 bribe secure $100,000 in State Bond Commission grant funds for Progressive Training Associates Inc., a vocational training program, and to misappropriating $40,682 in campaign funds for his own expenses. The executive director of the Progressive Training Associates, Warren Keith Godbolt, who gave the bribe, was also convicted of bribery in 2005. Godbolt cooperated with investigators in their investigation of Newton and was sentenced to probation.

In February 2006, Newton was sentenced to five years in federal prison. In imposing the sentence, Senior U.S. District Court Judge Alan H. Nevas criticized Newton's "Moses" remark, saying "I don't think there's any reference in the Bible ... that as God led his people for 40 years in the desert that he ever took money from them."

In February 2010, he was released from the federal prison camp in Lewisburg, Pennsylvania and moved to a halfway house in Waterbury, Connecticut.

Unsuccessful political comeback attempts in 2012 and 2014
In January 2012, after his release from prison, he announced that he would be seeking to return as the state Senator for the 23rd Senate district, his old seat. In May 2012, Newton received an endorsement from the Democratic Town Committee under Chairman Mario Testa to run for Senate. In the three-way August 2012 Democratic primary in August 2012, however, Newton lost to state Representative Andres Ayala, Jr., who received the endorsement of Mayor Bill Finch. Ayala also defeated incumbent senator Edwin A. Gomes. Ayala received 2,129 votes, Newton 1,739 votes, and Gomes 1,138 votes.

In 2014, Newton again unsuccessfully sought to make a political comeback, running for the 124th state House district. In March 2014, Newton again won the Democratic town committee nomination. However, Newton's opponent Andre F. Baker, Jr.—an undertaker, former Bridgeport city councilman, and board of education member—forced a Democratic primary by petition, and in the August 2014 primary election defeated Newton. Baker received the key support of Mayor Bill Finch. Baker received 697 votes to Newton's 430.

2015 campaign finance case
Newton was arrested in January 2013 on state campaign finance fraud charges.

On January 16, 2015, Newton was convicted of three charges of "illegal practices in campaign financing" and acquitted on a charge of witness tampering. The jury deadlocked on two other counts of illegal practices in campaign financing and two counts of first-degree larceny, and a mistrial was declared on those four charges.

On May 13, 2015, Newton was sentenced to three sentences of six months in jail, to run concurrently with each other, on the state charges. The state judge found that Newton received no personal financial benefit from the crime, and that the offense was a result of "his campaign's sloppiness and failure to keep track of how much it had raised"—a mitigating factor. The state judge freed Newton pending appeal and determined that if Newton was sent to prison for violating the terms of his federal probation (by committing the state campaign-finance offense), his six-month state sentence would run concurrently with his federal probation-violation sentence. Newton appeared in federal court in Hartford the next day.

A retrial on the first-degree larceny charges is pending. Newton rejected a plea offer in July 2016. For his retrial, Newton is seeking to be represented by a public defender, but it is unclear if Newton is income-eligible for publicly funded representation.

In 2018, the Connecticut Supreme Court overturned Newton's convictions for campaign finance violations, determining in a unanimous ruling that the jury instructions improperly omitted an intent element of the offense.

2017 election to City Council
In 2017, Newton mounted a political comeback when he was elected to the City Council again from his East End district. He defeated Councilman James Holloway in the September primary election and then won the general election.

Personal life
Newton is married; he and his wife Pamela have children.

References

1956 births
Living people
Politicians from Bridgeport, Connecticut
People from Fairfax County, Virginia
Winston-Salem State University alumni
Connecticut city council members
Democratic Party members of the Connecticut House of Representatives
Democratic Party Connecticut state senators
Connecticut politicians convicted of crimes
Politicians convicted of mail and wire fraud
American people convicted of campaign finance violations
African-American state legislators in Connecticut
21st-century African-American people
20th-century African-American people